Noisy-le-Sec is a commune in the eastern suburbs of Paris, France.

Population

Heraldry

Transport
Noisy-le-Sec is served by Noisy-le-Sec station on Paris RER line E.

Education
Schools:
 12 preschools
 9 elementary schools
 One combined preschool and elementary school
 Two junior high schools: Collège Cassin and Collège Prévert
 Collège et lycée Olympe-de-Gouges (combined junior and senior high school)
 Lycée professionnel Théodore-Monod (senior high school)

Personalities
Jean Delannoy, filmmaker
Amandine Buchard, judoka
Hassoun Camara, footballer
Féfé, rapper and singer, member of the Saian Supa Crew
Albin Lermusiaux (1874–1940), runner and shooter
French singer Eddy Mitchell lived in the city after his marriage in 1961
Hip hop group La Caution
Siné, cartoonist
Boubakary Soumare, footballer
Thomas Jordier, sprinter

See also
Communes of the Seine-Saint-Denis department

References

External links

noisylesec.fr - Official website - (in French)

Communes of Seine-Saint-Denis